The Commander-in-Chief's Guard, commonly known as Washington's Life Guard, was a unit of the Continental Army that protected General George Washington during the American Revolutionary War. Formed in 1776, the Guard was with Washington in all of his battles. It was disbanded in 1783 at the end of the war.

Creation and organization
The Second Continental Congress, the de facto governing body of the United Colonies (soon to be the United States) during the American Revolution, created the Continental Army on June 14, 1775, and appointed George Washington as General and Commander-in-Chief the next day. The army was organized in Massachusetts during the siege of Boston. Enlistments in the army expired at the end of 1775, and in 1776 a newly organized army was created by George Washington and the Congress.

The Commander-in-Chief's Guard was authorized on 11 March 1776 and organized the next day at Cambridge, Massachusetts. The purpose of the unit was to protect General Washington as well as the money and official papers of the Continental Army. General Washington directed the formation of a "corps of sober, intelligent, and reliable men". "Despite its impressive unit designation and its important mission," wrote military historian Mark Boatner, the Guard "appears to have been nothing more than what today would be called a headquarters security detachment."

The unit was initially created by selecting four men from each Continental Army regiment present at the siege of Boston. Washington's general order on 11 March outlined the type of men he hoped to recruit:

The General being desirous of selecting a particular number of men, as a Guard for himself, and baggage, The Colonel, or commanding Officer, of each of the established Regiments, (the Artillery and Rifflemen excepted) will furnish him with four, that the number wanted may be chosen out of them. His Excellency depends upon the Colonels for good Men, such as they can recommend for their sobriety, honesty, and good behaviour; he wishes them to be from five feet, eight Inches high, to five feet, ten Inches; handsomely and well made, and as there is nothing in his eyes more desirable, than Cleanliness in a Soldier, he desires that particular attention may be made, in the choice of such men, as are neat, and spruce. They are all to be at Head Quarters to morrow precisely at twelve, at noon, when the Number wanted will be fixed upon. The General neither wants men with uniforms, or arms, nor does he desire any man to be sent to him, that is not perfectly willing, and desirous, of being of this guard. They should be drill'd men.

The strength of the unit was usually 180 men, although this was temporarily increased to 250 during the winter of 1779–80, when the army was encamped at Morristown, New Jersey, in close proximity to the British Army. Because it was an honor to belong to the unit, care was taken to ensure that soldiers from each of the 13 states were represented in the Guard. Major Caleb Gibbs of Rhode Island was the first commander of the Guard, and was given the title of captain commandant. Gibbs was succeeded in 1779 by William Colfax.

The flag and uniform of the Commander-in-Chief's Guards was described by historian Benson John Lossing:

The flag is white silk, on which the device is neatly painted. One of the Guard is seen holding a horse, and is in the act of receiving a flag from the Genius of Liberty, who is personified as a woman leaning upon the Union shield, near which is the American eagle. The motto of the corps, "CONQUER OR DIE," is upon a ribbon. The uniform of the Guard consisted of a blue coat with white facings, white waistcoat and breeches, black half gaiters, a cocked hat with a blue and white feather.

In Godfrey's 1904 history of The Commander-in-Chief's Guard he provided "detailed sketches of its members", including six drummers, six fifers and a drum-major. In the final days of the war, the unit consisted of only 64 men. It was furloughed 6 June 1783, at Newburgh, New York, and disbanded on 15 November 1783.

Hickey mutiny
Several members of the Commander-in-Chief's Guard were involved in a shadowy conspiracy early in the war. After the conclusion of the Boston campaign in 1776, General Washington and the Continental Army marched to New York City and prepared for an anticipated attempt by the British to occupy the city. The Royal Governor of New York, William Tryon, had been driven out of the city by American Patriots and was compelled to seek refuge on a ship in New York Harbor. Nevertheless, the city had many residents, known as Loyalists, who favored the British side.

In the spring of 1776, Sergeant Thomas Hickey, a member of the Guard, was arrested with another soldier in New York for passing counterfeit money. While incarcerated, Hickey revealed to another prisoner, Isaac Ketcham, that he was part of a wider conspiracy of soldiers who were prepared to defect to the British once the expected invasion came. Hickey claimed that eight members of the Guard were involved in the plot. William Greene, a drummer in the Guard, was one of the conspirators, and David Mathews, the Mayor of New York City, was accused of funding the operation to bribe soldiers to join the British. The suspected men of the Guard were taken into custody by the provost marshal of the Continental Army. The conspiracy became greatly exaggerated in rumor, and was alleged to include plans to kidnap Washington, assassinate him and his officers, and blow up the Continental Army's ammunition magazines. Hickey, the only conspirator put on trial, was court-martialed and found guilty of mutiny and sedition. He was executed in New York on 28 June 1776 before a crowd of 20,000 spectators.

False claims of service in the Life Guards
Decades after the Revolution it was not uncommon for aged veterans to claim to have served in General Washington's Life Guard. One of the more famous of the false claims was made by Alexander Milliner of New York. When interviewed in 1864 by the Reverend Elias B. Hillard for his famous book The Last Men of the Revolution, Milliner claimed to be 104 and spun several stories of his (imagined) encounters with the general and "Lady Washington" during the last years of the Revolution. Later investigations determined that Milliner was only 94 (b. 1770) when he reminisced for Hillard, and that while he had served for several years as a drummer boy, he did so in a New York regiment and there was no record of a "Milliner" in the Life Guard.

Engagements
 Siege of Boston
 New York and New Jersey campaign
 Philadelphia campaign
 Yorktown campaign

See also
 United States Secret Service
 United States Marshals Service

References

Bibliography
 
Godfrey, Carlos E. Commander-in-Chief's Guard: Revolutionary War. Washington: Stevenson-Smith, 1904.
———. "The Commander in Chief's Guard." Pennsylvania Magazine of History and Biography 38 (January 1914):83–88. Transcripts of a few letters relating to provisioning the Guard. Available online (PDF format) from Pennsylvania State University.
Lossing, Benson J. "Washington's Life Guard". Historical Magazine 2 (1858):129–34.

Wehmann, Howard H. "To Major Gibbs With Much Esteem." Prologue 4 (1972):227–32.

External links
"Sons of Liberty Chapter" of the Sons of the American Revolution, which calls itself the "Home of the Commander-in-Chief Guards". Has several unreferenced history articles relating to the Guards.
Life Guards (George Washington's Mount Vernon)
Uzal Knapp memorial reported member of Washington Life Guards

Military units and formations established in 1776
Military units and formations disestablished in 1783
George Washington
Military units and formations of the Continental Army
Protective security units
Former guards regiments